Greatest Hits is the second greatest hits album and second compilation album by the Red Hot Chili Peppers. It was released on November 18, 2003, by Warner Bros. Records. Aside from their cover of "Higher Ground", all songs on the album are from the band's tenure on Warner Bros. Records from 1991 to 2002, in addition to two newly recorded songs.

Greatest Hits was released along with a separately sold DVD containing most of their music videos from the same time period.

The album was released with Copy Control protection system in some European markets, but not in the United States.

Overview
While their first hits compilation album What Hits!? encompasses material from their 1984 debut to 1989's Mother's Milk, this collection of songs takes off from that point, including material from their 1991 album Blood Sugar Sex Magik up through their 2002 album By the Way. It was during this period of their career that the band became a major commercial force in the music industry. Therefore, this compilation includes the majority of hit singles released since their breakthrough cover of Stevie Wonder's "Higher Ground".

"My Friends" is the only track included from the 1995 album, One Hot Minute. However, the music video for "Aeroplane" is featured on the DVD version of the compilation.

Also absent was the top ten hit "Around the World" from 1999 album Californication, although the DVD contained the music video for the song. Conversely, "Breaking the Girl" was not included on the DVD, as well as "Parallel Universe", the latter of which never had a music video released.

Of their eight U.S. number one singles on the Billboard Modern Rock Tracks chart up to that point, only one of them, "Can't Stop", from their 2002 album By the Way, was excluded, though again the music video was featured on the DVD.

To date, worldwide sales show that Greatest Hits has outsold six of the band's thirteen studio albums, including Mother's Milk and I'm with You, making it the band's fifth-highest-selling release.

Unreleased studio album
In 2011, drummer Chad Smith discussed the recording sessions for Greatest Hits, mentioning that the band had recorded sixteen songs and wished to release an entirely new album just for this material after a brief tour; however, guitarist John Frusciante was heavily against this idea at the time, claiming that his playing style had evolved and changed too much, as had his musical influences. Smith said there was an entire Red Hot Chili Peppers album out there that nobody would ever hear.

Aside from the two new tracks that debut on the album ("Fortune Faded" and "Save the Population"), only two other studio tracks from these sessions have been officially released. "Bicycle Song" and "Runaway" appeared as bonus tracks on the deluxe edition of By the Way when it was released on iTunes in 2006 and can now be found on many other digital music stores. Live versions of several other songs have also been released. "Rolling Sly Stone" and "Leverage Of Space" were included on the Live in Hyde Park album in 2004 and "Mini-Epic (Kill for Your Country)" was released as an "official" bootleg in 2015. A studio in-house CD-R was leaked in 2014 which contained two instrumental tracks from these sessions, called "Starlight" and "50/Fifty", and 3 different takes of "Runaway". The names of the remaining songs are either unknown or unconfirmed.

On February 7, 2014, in an interview with fans on Reddit, Smith claimed that the band hoped to one day release a box set including all unreleased material from the recording sessions for Greatest Hits.

Track listing

DVD

Greatest Hits and Videos was also released with the tracks above, including a DVD (available as Greatest Videos) containing the following music videos:

Charts

Weekly charts

Year-end charts

Decade-end charts

Certifications

References 

2003 greatest hits albums
Albums produced by Michael Beinhorn
Albums produced by Rick Rubin
Red Hot Chili Peppers compilation albums
2003 video albums
Music video compilation albums
Warner Records compilation albums
Warner Records video albums